Wei Daxun (born 12 April 1989), born in Jilin Province, China, is a Chinese actor, singer, and host. Wei ranked 85th on Forbes China Celebrity 100 list in 2019, and 56th in 2020.

He graduated from the 07-level undergraduate class of acting at the Central Academy of Drama.

Career
In 2008, he starred in the youth interactive idol drama "Sophie's Diary" directed by Lin Junchen, and played the gentle and romantic flower-protecting messenger Xiao Nan in the play. This was his first film and television drama work, thus officially entering the entertainment industry.

Wei started acting in 2014 in One and a Half Summer where he played a supporting role in the drama. In 2015, he starred in the youth film Forever Young.

In 2014, JYP Entertainment signed Wei, making him the first Chinese actor signed to the Korean company.

On July 10, 2015, his starring youth campus movie "Gardenia Blossoms" was released, in which he played the actor's promised brother Zhang Zaichang; later, he starred in the spy war drama "Grey Goose" directed by Wang Lixing. Zhong plays the actor Zhang Zimo, who looks cold and ruthless, but is in fact affectionate and righteous.

In January 2016, participated in the Jiangsu Satellite TV star love reality show "Let’s Fall in Love Season 2";

In January 2017, the Mango TV reasoning variety show "The Second Season of Star Detective" was broadcast.

In February 2018, as a regular guest, participated in the suspense-style outdoor reality show "Twenty-Four Hours Third Season" of Zhejiang Satellite TV's original series.

On February 4, 2019, participated in the Spring Festival Gala of China Central Radio and Television and sang the song "Imagination of Youth" with Han Xue, Guan Xiaotong, Wang Jia, and Typhoon Youth Group.

On January 17, 2020, Wei Daxun performed the opening song and dance "My New Year and New Wishes" with Yu Kewei at the China Central Radio Network Spring Festival Gala, and also sang the song "This Age".

Social Activity
On May 29, 2014, Wei went to Hong'an County, Hubei Province to participate in the "Dream Enjoying Music Classroom" charity event, which aims to bring dreams to impoverished children through music and at the same time strengthen cultural exchanges between young people in China and South Korea.

On January 7, 2017, he attended the "Green Bicycle China Charity Riding Event" held in Changsha and served as the image ambassador for this event [78]. In April 2019, he participated in the "ME/CFS Urban Slow Life Fan Jingxiang and Good Friends Charity Concert".

Character Evaluation
Wei Daxun has always been loved by the audience for his image of sunshine and smart acting, but he still has a tough and profound side. Wei Daxun has solid academic performance skills. In the TV series "Fu Nu" he digs into the depth of the role, thereby exerting his solid shaping power (Netease Review).

Wei Daxun's temperament is very plain and simple, and at the same time, his solid performance skills have allowed him to fully enter the character of Mao Anqing (comment by Liu Yiran).

Filmography

Film

Television series

Variety show

Discography

Accolades

References

External links 
 Wei Daxun on IMDb

1989 births
21st-century Chinese male actors
Living people
Chinese male film actors
Chinese male television actors
Male actors from Jilin
Central Academy of Drama alumni
JYP Entertainment artists